Mike Chernoff may refer to:

Mike Chernoff (baseball), American baseball general manager of the Cleveland Indians
Mike Chernoff (curler), Canadian curler and geologist
Mike Chernoff (ice hockey) (1946–2011), ice hockey left winger